Broadcast engineering is the field of electrical engineering, and now to some extent computer engineering and information technology, which deals with radio and television broadcasting.  Audio engineering and RF engineering are also essential parts of broadcast engineering, being their own subsets of electrical engineering.

Broadcast engineering involves both the studio and transmitter aspects (the entire airchain), as well as remote broadcasts.  Every station has a broadcast engineer, though one may now serve an entire station group in a city. In small media markets the engineer may work on a contract basis for one or more stations as needed.

Duties

Modern duties of a broadcast engineer include maintaining broadcast automation systems for the studio and automatic transmission systems for the transmitter plant.  There are also important duties regarding radio towers, which must be maintained with proper lighting and painting.  Occasionally a station's engineer must deal with complaints of RF interference, particularly after a station has made changes to its transmission facilities.

Titles

Broadcast engineers may have varying titles depending on their level of expertise and field specialty. Some widely used titles include:
 Broadcast design engineer
 Broadcast Integration Engineer
 Broadcast systems engineer
 Broadcast IT engineer
 Broadcast IT systems engineer
 Broadcast network engineer
 Broadcast maintenance engineer
 Video broadcast engineer
 TV studio broadcast engineer
 Outside broadcast engineer
 Remote broadcast engineer

Qualifications

Broadcast engineers may need to possess some or all of the following degrees, depending on the broadcast technical environment. If one of the formal qualifications is not present, a related degree or equivalent professional experience is desirable.
 Degree in electrical engineering
 Degree in electronic engineering
 Degree in telecommunications engineering
 Degree in computer engineering
 Degree in management information system
 Degree in broadcast technology

Knowledge

Broadcast engineers are generally required to know the following areas, from conventional video broadcast systems to modern Information Technology:
 Conventional broadcast
 Audio/Video instrumentation measurement
 Baseband video – standard / high-definition
 Broadcast studio acoustics
 Television studios - broadcast video cameras and camera lenses
 Production switcher (Video mixer)
 Audio mixer
 Recording engineer
 Broadcast IT
 Video compression - DV25, MPEG, DVB or ATSC (or ISDB)
 Digital server playout technologies. - VDCP, Louth, Harris, control protocols
 Broadcast automation
 Disk storage – RAID / NAS / SAN technologies.
 Archives – Tape archives or grid storage technologies.
 Computer networking
 Operating systems – Microsoft Windows / macOS / Linux / RTOS
 Post production – video capture and non-linear editing systems (NLEs).
 RF
 RF satellite uplinking – High-powered amplifiers (HPA)
 RF communications satellite downlinking – Band detection, carrier detection and IRD tuning, etc.
  RF transmitter maintenance - IOT UHF transmitters, solid-state VHF transmitters, solid-state MF transmitters (AM radio), tube type VHF, and MF transmitters. Antennas, transmission lines, high power filters, digital modulators, towers, tower lighting systems, and backup generators.
 Health and safety
 Occupational safety and health
 Fire suppression systems like FM 200.
 Basic structural engineering
 RF hazard mitigation

Above mentioned requirements vary from station to station.

Digital engineering

The conversion to digital broadcasting means broadcast engineers must now be well-versed in digital television and digital radio, in addition to analogue principles. New equipment from the transmitter to the radio antenna to the receiver may be encountered by engineers new to the field.  Furthermore, modern techniques place a greater demand on an engineer's expertise, such as sharing broadcast towers or radio antennas among different stations (diplexing).

Digital audio and digital video have revolutionized broadcast engineering in many respects. Broadcast studios and control rooms are now already digital in large part, using non-linear editing and digital signal processing for what used to take a great deal of time or money, if it was even possible at all.  Mixing consoles for both audio and video are continuing to become more digital in the 2000s, as is the computer storage used to keep digital media libraries.  Effects processing and TV graphics can now be realized much more easily and professionally as well.

With the broadcast industry's shift to IP-based production and content delivery technology not only the production technology and workflows are changing, but also the requirements for broadcast engineers, which now include IT and IP-networking knowhow.

Other devices used in broadcast engineering are telephone hybrids, broadcast delays, and dead air alarms.  See the Glossary of electrical and electronics engineering for further explanations.

Engineering services

Broadcast stations often call upon outside engineering services for specific needs; for example, because structural engineering is generally not a direct part of broadcast engineering, tower companies usually design broadcast towers.

Other companies specialize in both broadcast engineering and broadcast law, which are both essential when making an application to a national broadcasting authority for a construction permit or broadcast license.  This is especially critical in North America, where stations bear the entire burden of proving that their proposed facilities will not cause interference and are the best use of the radio spectrum.  Such companies now have special software that can map-projected radio propagation and terrain shielding, as well as lawyers that will defend the applications before the U.S. Federal Communications Commission (FCC), Canadian Radio-television and Telecommunications Commission (CRTC), or the equivalent authorities in some other countries.

Organizations

Brazil
 SET – Sociedade Brasileira de Engenharia de Televisão e Telecomunicações, Brazilian Society of Television and Telecommunications Engineering, Rio de Janeiro, Brazil.

Canada
 Central Canada Broadcast Engineers (CCBE), Paris, Ontario, Canada
 Western Association of Broadcast Engineers (WABE), Calgary, Alberta, Canada 
 IEEE Broadcast Technology Society (BTS) – Ottawa Section, Canada

Germany
 FKTG – Fernseh- und Kinotechnische Gesellschaft e.V., Germany

India
 Broadcast Engineering Society – BES (India), New Delhi, India

Iran
 Iran Broadcasting University Iran, Tehran (plus two campuses in Qom and Dubai)

Japan
 Institute of Electrical and Electronics Engineers - Japan Council

Mexico
 Asociación Mexicana de Ingenieros y Técnicos en Radiodifusión A.C. (AMITRA), Delegación Benito Juárez, México

People's Republic of China (PRC)
 China Society of Motion Picture and Television Engineers, China
 IEEE Broadcast Technology Society (BTS)  – Beijing Section, China
 IEEE Broadcast Technology Society (BTS)  – Shanghai Section, China

People's Republic of China – Hong Kong
 Society of Motion Picture and Television Engineers-(Hong Kong) Section, 電影電視工程師協會香港分會  Hong Kong
 Society of Broadcast Engineers Hong Kong Chapter, 廣播工程師協會香港分會 Hong Kong
 Hong Kong Televisioners Association (HKTVA), 香港電視專業人員協會 Hong Kong

Philippines
 Society of Broadcast Engineers and Technicians of the Philippines, Inc. (SBETP), Quezon City, Philippines

Republic of China – Taiwan
 IEEE Broadcast Technology Society (BTS) – Taipei Section

South Africa
 The South African Broadcasting Corporation (SABC), Auckland Park, Johannesburg, South Africa,

South Korea
 Korean Broadcast Engineers & Technicians Association (KOBETA), Seoul, South Korea (ROK)

Turkey
 Chamber of Electrical Engineers (EMO) (Joint chamber of electrical, electronics and biomedical engineers)

United States

In the United States, many broadcast engineers belong to the Society of Broadcast Engineers (SBE). Some may also belong to the Society of Motion Picture and Television Engineers (SMPTE), or to organizations of related fields, such as the Audio Engineering Society or Institute of Electrical and Electronics Engineers (IEEE)  - IEEE Broadcast Technology Society (BTS).

For public radio, the Association of Public Radio Engineers was created in late May 2006.

Uruguay
 ANDEBU – Asociación Nacional de Broadcasters Uruguayos, Montevideo, Uruguay

Notable publications
 Broadcast Beat
 Radio (formerly BE Radio)
 Radio World
 TV Technology

See also

 Engineering technician
 Technical operator

References

 
Computer engineering
Broadcasting occupations
Television terminology
Engineering disciplines